Darmono (born in Klaten, June 5, 1953) is a former prosecutor and Attorney General of Indonesia. Before retirement, Darmono was deputy attorney general, a position he occupied since December 23, 2009 after the resignation of Abdul Hakim Ritonga. Darmono was appointed as acting attorney general on September 24, 2010 by Indonesian President Susilo Bambang Yudhoyono in order to replace Hendarman Supandji who had been honorably discharged with the Presidential Decree No. 104 of 2010.

References

Prosecution
Attorneys General of Indonesia
20th-century Indonesian lawyers
People from Klaten Regency
1953 births
Living people
21st-century Indonesian lawyers